As of October 2022, there are 164 validly published species in Clostridium, as well as 38 species described but not validly published.

Species 

 Clostridium aceticum
 Clostridium acetireducens
 Clostridium acetobutylicum
 Clostridium acidisoli
 Clostridium aciditolerans
 Clostridium aestuarii
 Clostridium akagii
 Clostridium algidicarnis
 Clostridium algifaecis
 Clostridium algoriphilum
 Clostridium amazonense
 Clostridium aminophilum
 Clostridium amylolyticum
 Clostridium arbusti
 Clostridium arcticum cae
 Clostridium argentinense
 Clostridium aurantibutyricum
 Clostridium autoethanogenum
 Clostridium baratii
 Clostridium beijerinckii
 Clostridium bornimense
 Clostridium botulinum
 Clostridium bowmanii
 Clostridium butyricum
 Clostridium cadaveris
 Clostridium carboxidivorans
 Clostridium carnis
 Clostridium cavendishii
 Clostridium celatum
 Clostridium cellulofermentans
 Clostridium cellulosi
 Clostridium cellulovorans
 Clostridium chartatabidum
 Clostridium chauvoei
 Clostridium chromiireducens
 Clostridium cochlearium
 Clostridium colletant
 Clostridium cocleatum
 Clostridium colicanis
 Clostridium colinum
 Clostridium collagenovorans
 Clostridium cylindrosporum
 Clostridium diolis
 Clostridium disporicum
 Clostridium drakei
 Clostridium estertheticum
 Clostridium fallax
 Clostridium felsineum
 Clostridium fimetarium
 Clostridium formicaceticum
 Clostridium frigidicarnis
 Clostridium frigoris
 Clostridium ganghwense
 Clostridium gasigenes
 Clostridium glycolicum
 Clostridium grantii
 Clostridium haemolyticum
 Clostridium herbivorans
 Clostridium homopropionicum
 Clostridium huakuii
 Clostridium hydrogeniformans
 Clostridium hylemonae
 Clostridium jeddahense
 Clostridium innocuum
 Clostridium intestinale
 Clostridium isatidis
 Clostridium kluyveri
 Clostridium lacusfryxellense
 Clostridium leptum
 Clostridium liquoris
 Clostridium ljungdahlii
 Clostridium lundense
 Clostridium luticellarii
 Clostridium magnum
 Clostridium malenominatum
 Clostridium methoxybenzovorans
 Clostridium methylpentosum
 Clostridium moniliforme
 Clostridium nexile
 Clostridium nitrophenolicum
 Clostridium novyi
 Clostridium oceanicum
 Clostridium oryzae 
 Clostridium paradoxum
 Clostridium paraputrificum
 Clostridium pascui
 Clostridium pasteurianum
 Clostridium peptidivorans
 Clostridium perfringens
 Clostridium phytofermentans
 Clostridium piliforme
 Clostridium polysaccharolyticum
 Clostridium polyendosporum
 Clostridium populeti
 Clostridium psychrophilum
 Clostridium puniceum
 Clostridium punense
 Clostridium putrefaciens
 Clostridium putrificum
 Clostridium quinii
 "Clostridium ragsdalei"
 Clostridium ramosum
 Clostridium roseum
 Clostridium saccharobutylicum
 Clostridium saccharogumia
 Clostridium saccharoperbutylacetonicum
 Clostridium sardiniense
 Clostridium sartagoforme
 Clostridium saudiense 
 Clostridium senegalense
 Clostridium scatologenes
 Clostridium schirmacherense
 Clostridium scindens
 Clostridium septicum
 Clostridium spiroforme
 Clostridium sporogenes
 Clostridium sporosphaeroides
 Clostridium subterminale
 Clostridium sulfidigenes
 Clostridium swellfunianum
 Clostridium symbiosum
 Clostridium tagluense
 Clostridium tarantellae
 Clostridium tepidiprofundi
 Clostridium termitidis
 Clostridium tertium
 Clostridium tetani
 Clostridium tetanomorphum
 Clostridium thermoalcaliphilum
 Clostridium thermobutyricum
 Clostridium thermopalmarium
 Clostridium thermopapyrolyticum
 Clostridium thermosuccinogenes
 Clostridium thiosulfatireducens
 Clostridium tyrobutyricum
 Clostridium uliginosum
 Clostridium vincentii
 Clostridium viride
 Clostridium vulturis

Species formerly placed in Clostridium
 Order Caryophanales
 Family Paenibacillaceae
 Genus Oxalophagus: Clostridium oxalicum, reassigned in 1994.
 Genus Paenibacillus: Clostridium durum, reassigned in 1994.

 Order Eubacteriales
 Family Clostridiaceae
 Genus Asaccharospora: Clostridium irregulare, reassigned in 2014.
 Genus Caloramator: Clostridium fervidum, reassigned in 1994.
 Genus Hathewaya: Clostridium histolyticum, C. limosum and C. proteolyticum, reassigned in 2016.
 Genus Hungatella: Clostridium hathewayi, reassigned in 2014.
 Genus Intestinibacter: Clostridium bartlettii, reassigned in 2014.
 Genus Oxobacter: Clostridium pfennigii, reassigned in 1994.
 Genus Paeniclostridium: Clostridium ghonii and C. sordellii, reassigned in 2016.
 Genus Paraclostridium: Clostridium bifermentans, reassigned in 2016.
 Genus Romboutsia: Clostridium lituseburense, reassugned in 2014.
 Genus Sarcina: Clostridium maximum and C. ventriculi. Originally described in Sarcina, proposed to be moved to Clostridium in 2016 but remained due to Sarcina being the older genus.
 Genus Terrisporobacter: Clostridium glycolicus and C. mayombei, reassigned in 2014.
 Family Eubacteriaceae
 Genus Eubacteria: Clostridium barkeri, reassigned in 1994.
 Family Lachnospiraceae
 Genus Anaerocolumna: Clostridium aminovalericum,  C. jejuense and C. xylanovorans, reassigned in 2016.
 Genus Anaerotignum: Clostridium lactatifermentans, C. neopropionicum and C. propionicum, reassigned in 2017
 Genus Blautia: Clostridium coccoides, reassigned in 2008.
 Genus Butyrivibrio: Clostridium proteoclasticum, reassigned in 2008.
 Genus Cellulosilyticum: C. lentocellum, reassigned in 2010.
 Genus Enterocloster: Clostridium aldenense, C.  asparagiforme, C. bolteae, C. citroniae, C. clostridioforme and C. lavalense, reassigned in 2020.
 Genus Faecalicatena: Clostridium oroticum, reassigned in 2017.
 Genus Lacrimispora: Clostridium aerotolerans, C. algidixylanolyticum, C. amygdalinum, C. celerecrescens, C. indolis, C. saccharolyticum, C. sphenoides, C. xylanolyticum
 Genus Mediterraneibacter: Clostridium glycyrrhizinilyticum, reassigned in 2019
 Family Oscillospiraceae
 Genus Acetivibrio: Clostridium aldrichii, C. alkalicellulosi, C. clariflavum, C. straminisolvens and C. thermocellum, reassigned in 2019.
 Genus Flavonifractor: Clostridium orbiscindens, merged with Eubacterium plautii and moved to new genus in 2010.
 Genus Ruminiclostridium: Clostridium cellobioparum,  Clostridium cellulolyticum, Clostridium hungatei, Clostridium josui, Clostridium papyrosolvens, Clostridium sufflavum and 'Clostridium termitidis reassigned in 2018.
 Genus Thermoclostridium: Clostridium caenicola and C. stercorarium, reassigned in 2018.
 Family Peptostreptococcaceae
 Genus Acetoanaerobium: Clostridium sticklandii, reassigned in 2016.
 Genus Clostridioides: Clostridium difficile and C. mangenotii, reassigned in 2016.
 Genus Filifactor: Clostridium villosum, reassigned in 1994.
 Genus Maledivibacter: Clostridium halophilum, reassigned in 2016.
 Genus Paramaledivibacter: Clostridium caminithermale, reassigned in 2016.
 Genus Peptacetobacter: Clostridium hiranonis, reassigned in 2020.
 Genus Peptoclostridium: C. litorale, reassigned in 2016.
 Family Syntrophomonadaceae
 Genus Syntrophospora: Clostridium bryantii, reassigned in 1990.

 Order Fusobacteriales
 Family Fusobacteriaceae
 Genus Fusobacterium: Clostridium rectum, merged into Fusobacterium mortiferum in 2017.

 Order Halanaerobiales
 Family Halobacteroidaceae
 Genus Sporohalobacter: Clostridium lortetii, reassigned in 1984.

 Order Selenomonadales
 Family Sporomusaceae
 Genus Dendrosporobacter: Clostridium quercicolum, reassigned in 2000.

 Order Thermoanaerobacterales
 Family Thermoanaerobacteraceae
 Genus Moorella: Clostridium thermaceticum and C. thermautotrophicum, reassigned in 1994.
 Genus Thermoanaerobacter: Clostridium thermohydrosulfuricum and C. thermosulfurigenes, reassigned in 1993 and Clostridium thermocopriae and  C. thermosaccharolyticum, reassigned in 1994.

 Order Tissierellales
 Family Gottschalkiaceae
 Genus Gottschalkia: Clostridium acidurici and C. purinilyticum, first proposed in 2013 together with Clostridium angusta, reassigned in 2017.
 Family Tissierellaceae
 Genus Schnuerera: Clostridium ultunense, reassigned in 2020.
 Genus Tissierella: Clostridium hastiforme, reassigned in 1986.
 Unassigned to family
 Genus Sedimentibacter: C. hydroxybenzoicum'', reassigned in 2002.

References

Lists of bacteria